The Apostolic Faith Mission  church in Clinton Hill, Brooklyn, New York City, located at 265 Lafayette Avenue northeast corner of Washington Avenue, occupies the historic nineteenth-century former Orthodox Friends Meeting House.

The former Society of Friends (Quaker) meetinghouse was built 1868, described in the AIA Guide to New York City as "A simple Lombardian Romanesque box polychromed with vigor by its current tenants." As of 1977, it was the Apostolic Faith Mission.

References 
Dunlap, David W. From Abyssinian to Zion: A Guide to Manhattan's Houses of Worship. (New York: Columbia University Press, 2004.)

Quaker meeting houses in New York City
Churches in Brooklyn
Churches completed in 1868
19th-century Quaker meeting houses
Victorian architecture in New York City
Romanesque Revival church buildings in New York City
Closed churches in New York City
National Register of Historic Places in Brooklyn